The Assault of Paso Cidra was an allied military operation during the Paraguayan War, which took place on May 20, 1866 in Estero Bellaco, Paraguay. The action consisted of the assault by Brazilian forces of the 2nd Infantry Battalion, under the command of Vanderlei Lins, subordinate of Uruguayan general Venâncio Flores, to a Paraguayan entrenched position, defended by men of Lieutenant Colonel Avelino Cabral. The operation was successful, with taking the position and clearing the path for the Allied march.

References 

Battles involving Paraguay
Battles of the Paraguayan War
Battles involving Brazil
May 1866 events
Conflicts in 1866
History of Ñeembucú Department